Kfar Malal is a moshav in central Israel. Located in the Sharon plain, it falls under the jurisdiction of Drom HaSharon Regional Council.

History

Before the 20th century the area formed part of the Forest of Sharon. It was an open woodland dominated by Mount Tabor Oak, which extended from Kfar Yona in the north to Ra'anana in the south. The local Arab inhabitants traditionally used the area for pasture, firewood and intermittent cultivation. The intensification of settlement and agriculture in the coastal plain during the 19th century led to deforestation and subsequent environmental degradation.

The village was established in 1911 as "Ein Hai" (lit. Fountain of the Living) on privately owned land. The original name was based on the name of ruins previously located there, Khurbet el-Haiyeh. In 1914 the village was renamed into Kfar Malal after Moshe Leib Lilienblum, an early leader of the Hovevei Zion movement, whose acronym in Hebrew is MLL (מל"ל).

The village was destroyed in the battles of World War I, resettled by a group of laborers and ravaged again in the 1921 Jaffa riots. In 1922, the land was transferred to the Jewish National Fund and Kfar Malal was rebuilt as a moshav. It suffered more attacks in the 1929 Arab riots. Ariel Sharon, Israel's eleventh prime minister, was born in Kfar Malal. His parents moved there in 1922. The first year and a half they lived in a tent while his father built a two room house. Initially their mule and cow were kept in one of the rooms. There was no electricity or running water. In his autobiography he recalls watching rats crawling around the roof space.
He also recalled that his mother slept with a rifle under her bed until her dying day due to the trauma of hiding in the cowshed with her children at night to escape roving Bedouin gangs.

Economy
In 2006, Malal Park Industries Ltd, co-owned by members of Kfar Malal, signed an agreement with the German bank Eurohypo AG to refinance Park Azorim in Kiryat Aryeh, Petah Tikva. 

In 2009, NI Medical, a biotech company located in Kfar Malal, received approval by the U.S. Food and Drug Administration (FDA) for a device that assesses left ventricular systolic dysfunction (LVSD). The device aids physicians in detecting heart failure in its pre-clinical, asymptomatic phase.

Notable people 
 Ariel Sharon, Israeli general and politician who served as the 11th Prime Minister of Israel

References

1929 Palestine riots
Moshavim
Populated places in Central District (Israel)
1911 establishments in the Ottoman Empire
Populated places established in 1911